Knights of Chaos is an all-male New Orleans Carnival Krewe and rumored facade for the Knights of Momus.

Parade
The Knights of Chaos parade on Jeudi Gras, the traditional night of the Momus, the Thursday night prior to Mardi Gras. The parade follows the uptown route for parades starting at Napoleon Avenue and Magazine Street; proceed north to St. Charles; proceed east on St. Charles to Lee Circle continuing on St. Charles to Canal Street. The parade follows the Knights of Babylon parade and is followed by the Krewe of Muses.

The Knights of Chaos use flambeaux to light the route.

Parade themes
Knights of Chaos parade themes are typically satirical in nature and are not revealed until the parade rolls.

Royal court
The Knights of Chaos king is named Chaos, sometimes known as Number One. The identity of Chaos is kept secret and is never revealed.

See Also
Knights of Momus
The Louisiana Club
Twelfth Night Revelers

References 

Mardi Gras in New Orleans
Performing groups established in 2000